Jean-Arnaud Raymond (4 April 1742, Toulouse - 28 January 1811, Paris) was a French architect in the Palladian style.

Biography 
He was born to a family of carpenters. In 1759, he began his architectural studies at the new , then went to Paris, where he attended the Académie Royale d'Architecture, under the direction of Jacques-François Blondel and Jacques-Germain Soufflot. 

He won the Prix de Rome in 1766, with his design for the portal of a cathedral, then spent eight years in Italy where he developed a strong attachment to the work of Andrea Palladio. On his way back to Paris, he was appointed architect for the Estates of Languedoc.

In 1783, he was called to the reconstruction site of the Notre-Dame-de-Prouille Monastery, to proceed with interior alterations that had been started in 1746 by Jacques Hardouin-Mansart de Sagonne. The work was completed from 1785 to 1787. During this time, in 1784, he was admitted to the Académie d'Architecture (the Académie Royale's successor) and was one of the founding members of the Institut de France

He was elected to the Académie des Beaux-Arts in 1795, becoming the first person to occupy Seat #6 for architecture. Three years later, he was named Chief Architect for the Palais du Louvre. In 1806, he and  Jean Chalgrin were placed in charge of planning the Arc de Triomphe, but the incompatibility of their proposals led to a conflict that forced Raymond to resign. Neither lived to see the project in its final form.

References

Further reading 
 Philippe Cachau : "Le monastère royal de Prouille au XVIII-e siècle. La reconstruction par Jacques Hardouin-Mansart de Sagonne, architecte du roi (1746-1787)", (series: Les bâtiments du monastère de Prouilhe), In: Mémoire Dominicaine, #32, Fribourg 2015, pp.83-163.
 David de Pénanrun, et al., Les architectes élèves de l'école des beaux-arts (1793-1907), Librairie de la construction moderne, 2nd Ed., 1907, pg.383
 Obituary, Journal de Paris, 4 February 1811, pg.282

External links

 Data and references from the Comité des travaux historiques et scientifiques @ La France Savante

1742 births
1811 deaths
French architects
Members of the Académie des beaux-arts
Members of the Institut de France
Architects from Toulouse